Riaz Uddin Ahamed Siddique (better known as Riaz) is a Bangladeshi film actor, producer, model and television presenter. Through his successful career in Bengali films (Dhallywood), Riaz has established himself as one of the most popular actors of Bangladeshi cinema, he has appeared in more than 100 Bengali films in genres ranging from romance to action and comedies. He is the recipient of numerous achievements, including three National Film Awards and seven Meril Prothom Alo Awards.

Awards and nominations 
Riaz has received Three National Film Awards for his unique contribution in the Bangladesh film industry. Acting for the films Dui Duari ( 2000) by Humayun Ahmed, Daruchini Dwip (2007) by Tauquir Ahmed and Ki Jadu Korila (2008) by Chandan Chowdhury.

National Film Awards 

Winner
 Best Actor for Dui Duari - 2000
 Best Actor for Daruchini Diwp - 2007
 Best Actor for Ki Jadu Korila - 2008
Nomination
 Best Actor for Modhumoti - 2011

Meril Prothom Alo Awards 
Winner
 Best Actor for Praner Cheye Priyo - 1998
 Best Actor for Shoshurbari Zindabad - 2001
 Best Actor for Premer Taj Mahal - 2002
 Best Actor for Moner Majhe Tumi - 2003
 Best Actor for (Critiks) Shasti: Punishment - 2004
 Best Actor (Critiks) Hajar Bachhor Dhore: Symphony of Agony - 2005
 Best Actor for Hridoyer Kotha - 2006
Nomination
 Best Film Actor - 1999
 Best Film Actor - 2000
 Best Film Actor - 2007
 Best Film Actor - 2008 Akash Chhoa Bhalobasa
 Best Film Actor - 2009
 Best Film Actor - 2010
 Best Film Actor - 2011
 Best Film Actor - 2012

Other awards

CJFC Awards 
Winner
 Best Film Actor - 1998

Lux Channel I Performance Awards 
Winner
 Best Film Actor - 2003 (Dubai)
 Best Film Actor - 2005

Bangla TV Best Performance Awards 
Winner
 Best Film Actor - 2003 (London)

Dhallywood Film and Music Awards 
Winner
 Best Film Actor - 2002 (New York)
 Best Film Actor - 2003 (New York)

Diamond World Channel I Best Awards
Nominated
 Best Film Actor - 2011

See also 
 Bangladeshi film actor
 Cinema of Bangladesh

References

External links 

 
 

Riaz